Rabbi Mordechai Dovid Unger Shlita is the first Rebbe of Bobov-45.

Biography
Unger was born in 1954 to Yaakov Yitzchok Unger of Dombrov. He is the younger son-in-law of Rabbi  Naftali Zvi Halberstam, the fourth Bobover Rebbe.

Following the death of his father-in-law in 2005, a dispute arose as to who should be the Grand Rebbe of Bobov. Most began to follow Ben Zion Aryeh Leibish Halberstam, while some followed Rabbi Unger.  In the end, a beth din (religious court) ruled; Rabbi Benzion Halberstam being declared Rebbe of Bobov. and Rabbi Mordechai Dovid Unger Shlita Rebbe of Bobov-45. Although some leading Jewish Torah scholars, such as the late Rav Roth, disagreed with the ruling, Rabbi Unger agreed to obey the ruling.

Politics
Brooklyn Borough President Eric Adams visited Bobov–45 as part of his 2017 re-election campaign.

See also
 Dombrov
 Borough Park, Brooklyn

References

Rabbi Mordechai Dovid Unger Shlita

1954 births
Living people
American Hasidic rabbis
Rebbes of Bobov
Rabbis from New York (state)
People from Borough Park, Brooklyn
Descendants of the Baal Shem Tov